Helsted is a surname. Notable people with the surname include:

Axel Helsted (1847–1907), Danish painter
Carl Helsted (1818–1904), Danish composer
Dyveke Helsted (1919–2005), Danish art historian and museum director
Edvard Helsted (1816–1900), Danish composer
Frederik Ferdinand Helsted (1809–1875), Danish painter and drawing master
Gustav Helsted (1857–1924), Danish organist and composer